Zaxxon 3D is a 1987 video game published by Sega for the Master System console. It is based on Sega's 1981 arcade game, Zaxxon.

Gameplay
Zaxxon 3D is a game in which the player pilots a Zaxxon craft through nine levels of the Vargan Space Fortress, with the SegaScope 3-D Glasses wired directly into the game system.

Reception
Bill Kunkel reviewed the game for Computer Gaming World, and stated that "words cannot adequately describe the sensations one experiences while playing this game. Though other arcade games have tried to duplicate an illusion of depth, they all comes short of the mark. Zaxxon 3-D serves up the real thing, in a format familiar to most gamers".

Reviews
Computer and Video Games - Apr, 1988
Tilt - Mar, 1988

References

External links
Review in Power Play (German)
Entry in Complete Guide to Consoles
Review in Arcades (French)

1988 video games
Master System games
Master System-only games
Rail shooters
Sega video games
Shoot 'em ups
Video games developed in Japan
Video games set in outer space
Video games with stereoscopic 3D graphics